The Tickhill Road Hospital is a small hospital at Tickhill Road in Doncaster, South Yorkshire. It is managed by the Rotherham Doncaster and South Humber NHS Foundation Trust.

History
The hospital was built by Adshead, Topham and Adshead as an isolation hospital between 1928 and 1929. The hospital wards are named after trees with names such as Ash, Elm and Pine Wards and, more recently, Hazel Ward. It specialises in rehabilitation for older people before they return home. It is located close to the St Catherine's Hospital which is separate and provides mental health services.

See also
 List of hospitals in England

References

External links

Official site

Hospitals established in 1928
Hospitals in South Yorkshire
NHS hospitals in England
Buildings and structures in Doncaster
1928 establishments in England